List of mayors of Portland may refer to:

List of mayors of Portland, Maine
List of mayors of Portland, Oregon